General elections were held in Luxembourg on 7 June 1964. Despite receiving fewer votes than the Luxembourg Socialist Workers' Party, the Christian Social People's Party remained the largest party, winning 22 of the 56 seats in the Chamber of Deputies.

Results

References

Chamber of Deputies (Luxembourg) elections
Legislative election, 1964
Luxembourg
General election
Luxembourg